Dwight Township may refer to the following places in the United States:

 Dwight Township, Livingston County, Illinois
 Dwight Township, Michigan

Township name disambiguation pages